Metarctia tenebrosa is a moth of the subfamily Arctiinae. It was described by Ferdinand Le Cerf in 1922. It is found in Ethiopia, Kenya and Tanzania.

References

 

Metarctia
Moths described in 1922